Kemi-Tornio Airport is an airport in Kemi, Finland. The airport is owned and operated by Finavia.

Terminal
There is a small cafe/restaurant landside at the airport, open to the public and to passengers. There is also a small gift shop for souvenirs. The following car rental companies serve at Kemi airport: Avis, Budget, Europcar, Hertz and Scandia Rent

Airlines and destinations
The following airlines operate regular scheduled and charter flights at Kemi-Tornio Airport:

Statistics

Passengers

Freight and Mail

Ground transportation
There is no public transportation directly to the airport. Airport taxi to Kemi takes around 15 minutes in travel time whereas the trip to Tornio takes approximately 25 minutes. There is a parking lot just in front of the terminal door.

See also 
List of the largest airports in the Nordic countries

References

External links

Finavia – Kemi-Tornio Airport
AIP Finland – Kemi-Tornio Airport

Airports in Finland
Airport
Airport
Airport
Buildings and structures in Lapland (Finland)